Wolfgang Döring (November 11, 1919 – January 17, 1963) was a German politician of the Free Democratic Party (FDP) and former member of the German Bundestag.

Life 
From 1954 to 1958 Döring was a member of the state parliament in North Rhine-Westphalia. In 1955 he became deputy parliamentary party leader and, after the change of government on March 12, 1956, chairman of the FDP parliamentary party.

From October 15, 1957, until his death, Döring was a member of the German Bundestag. He was elected via the state list in North Rhine-Westphalia and had been deputy chairman of the FDP parliamentary faction since 1961.

Literature

References

1919 births
1963 deaths
Members of the Bundestag for North Rhine-Westphalia
Members of the Bundestag 1961–1965
Members of the Bundestag 1957–1961
Members of the Bundestag for the Free Democratic Party (Germany)
Members of the Landtag of North Rhine-Westphalia